Sasha-Lee Davids born in Atlantis, Western Cape, South Africa is a singer and the 2009 co-winner of South African Idols season 5. She is also the winner of the 2008 reality TV show "Matrix" season 2.

Early life
Davids comes from Atlantis in the Western Cape. She is one of 10 children, and her father is a pastor.

Idols
Sasha-Lee Davids was originally declared the sole winner after singing the winner's song "True Believer". But apparently, there had been a mix-up with late votes arriving after the cutoff time on the night of the finale. The SMS messages had been sent before the cutoff time but were only received after the deadline. M-Net made the public aware of the matter within a day and assured everyone that a recount of the votes would be done as soon as possible.

The recount showed that Jason Hartman, the then runner-up was actually the winner, with 1.3 million votes, or 54% of the total. Sasha-Lee had come second, with 1.1 million votes, or 46%. M-Net decided however that "200,000 votes are not significant enough, and the results so close, the only fair thing to do under the circumstances is to declare a tie".

Discography

Albums
2009: Sasha-Lee

Singles
2009 : True Believer
2014 : girl behind the wall
2014 : It's so clear by Mandoza ft Sasha-Lee 
2015 : I cry
2017 : forever yours
2018: free falling
2019: Africa Arise ft All 4 One

References

External links
Sasha-Lee Davids Facebook

21st-century South African women singers
Living people
Idols South Africa winners
People from the Western Cape
Year of birth missing (living people)